Free Zone station is a station of the Doha Metro's Red Line. It serves the Al Wakrah Municipality, namely Al Wakrah City, Ras Abu Fontas and Barwa Village. It is located near Airforce Interchange, which is the crossing of F Ring Road and Al Wakrah Road.

History
As part of the metro's Phase 1, the station was inaugurated on 8 May 2019, along with most other Red Line stations.

Station details
Among the station's facilities are a Qatar National Bank ATM, a prayer room and restrooms.

MetroLink Bus
There is one metrolink, which is the Doha Metro's free feeder bus network, servicing the station:
M140, which serves the Religious Complex in Mesaimeer.

Connections
It is served by bus routes 10, 119, and 129.

References

Doha Metro stations
2019 establishments in Qatar
Railway stations opened in 2019